Macrosiphoniella yomogifoliae is an aphid species.

References

Insects described in 1922
Macrosiphini